Faiza Ahmad Khan is an Indian documentary filmmaker based in Mumbai. Her most well-known work is Supermen of Malegaon, a documentary film which revolves around the passion which residents of Malegaon have for filmmaking.

She is also an activist. She directed the film The Cost of Coal, a 360° virtual reality story about the lives of the Adivasi communities living around the Kusmunda mine in the district of Korba, Chhattisgarh. She has  openly protested against the 'redevelopment' of Golibar Slum in Mumbai.

Education and career 
In 2002, Faiza Ahmad Khan studied a course in social communications media and then worked as a production executive for an advertising agency. She started shooting short documentaries in 2004. In 2005, she worked as assistant director for the movie Anwar, with director Manish Jha.

Supermen of Malegaon was her first feature documentary, which has received at least 15 awards so far. The film has been screened at New Yorks Museum of Modern Art. However, for Faiza, the most important moment in the films life was its screening on the Narmada Ghats.

Filmography

Director 

Supermen of Malegaon (2012)
When All Land Is Lost, Do We Eat Coal? (2016)
The Cost of Coal (2017)

Assistant director 
 Anwar (2007)

Awards

For Supermen of Malegaon
 Jury Award for Best Documentary at Asiatica Film Mediale, Rome 
 Jury Award for Best Documentary at Kara Film Festival, Pakistan 
 Best Debut Film at Film South Asia, Nepal
 Best Editing, Documentary and Director at the Asian Festival of First Films, Singapore
 Best Editing at the Asian TV Awards, Singapore
 Audience Choice Award for Documentary, Indian Film Festival of Los Angeles (IFFLA) 
 Golden Camera Award for Best Documentary, US International Film and Video Festival
 Gold Awards for Editing and Best Documentary and a Silver Award for Sound Design, Indian Documentary Producers Association
 Best Documentary at Bollywood and Beyond, Stuttgart
 Youth Choice Award at Vesoul Asian Film Festival
 Special Mention at Best Film Festival, Romania

References

External links
 
 Director Faiza Ahmad Khan talks

Living people
Indian women film directors
Indian documentary filmmakers
21st-century Indian film directors
Film directors from Mumbai
Film producers from Mumbai
Indian women film producers
Indian women documentary filmmakers
Hindi film producers
Hindi-language film directors
Women artists from Maharashtra
21st-century Indian women artists
Year of birth missing (living people)